'Til Death is an American sitcom. It aired on Fox from September 7, 2006, to June 20, 2010. A total of 81 episodes of  'Til Death were produced over four seasons.

Series overview

Episodes

Season 1 (2006–07)

Season 2 (2007–08)

Season 3 (2008)

Season 4 (2009–10)

References

External links
'Til Death official Sony Pictures site

Lists of American sitcom episodes